Tavannes railway station is a railway station in the municipality of Tavannes, in the Swiss canton of Bern. It is located at the junction of the standard gauge Sonceboz-Sombeval–Moutier line of Swiss Federal Railways and the  gauge Tavannes–Noirmont line of Chemins de fer du Jura.

Services
The following services stop at Tavannes:

 Regio:

References

External links 
 
 

Railway stations in the canton of Bern
Swiss Federal Railways stations